Kirvan Fortuin (10 August 1991 – 13 June 2020) was a Khoikhoi First nation dancer, choreographer and LGBT activist, the child of Ms Charlotte Fortuin, a Khoikhoi community stripped of language, land and culture and who were erased as a people post-democracy South Africa

Career
Born in Macassar, Fortuin joined the Cape Whalers Field Band in 2002, which prompted their interest in dance. They began formal dance training at the University of Cape Town in 2010, studying classical dance, contemporary dance, African dance and other dance forms. Fortuin qualified with a dance teacher's diploma in 2012 and performed that year at the International Theatre School Festival in Amsterdam, the Netherlands. They received a BMus (Hons) in choreography from University of Cape Town, and a Bachelor of Dance from Codarts University for the Arts in Rotterdam.

Fortuin choreographed works for the Cape Town City Ballet, Dance Umbrella Johannesburg, Vrystaat Kunstefees, Artscape Theatre Centre, Suidoosterfees, Afrovibes NL & SA and the Afrikaanse Kultuurfees. They founded House of Le Cap, South Africa's first ballroom house, in 2017. As an LGBT activist, Fortuin hosted Africa's first Vogue Ball on World AIDS Day to raise awareness and fund for the LGBT community affected by HIV.

Awards and recognition
In 2012, Fortuin received the Best International Production (Guest Award) at the International Theatre School Festival in Amsterdam. University of Cape Town recognised them with an award for Meritorious Achievement in the Performing and Creative Arts in 2012. From 2014 to 2015 Fortuin was recognised by Krisztina de Chatel's foundation, Stichting Imperium, and received a stipend from the organisation. Fortuin was the recipient of the Dance Award for Modern Dance from the Pierino Ambrosoli Foundation in Zurich. In 2019 Fortuin was awarded the Ministerial Award for Outstanding Contribution to Preservation and Promotion of an Indigenous Art Form from the Western Cape Government.

Death
Fortuin was fatally stabbed on 13 June 2020 in their hometown of Macassar. A fourteen-year-old girl was arrested in connection with their death.

Choreographed works

An Aborted Beginning (a dance film)
Loud Silence: In The Memory of Her Mind
Kirby K, premiered in September 2014
When They Leave (with Romane Petit), premiered in May 2015 at De Doelen Theatre, Rotterdam
Tussen Niks en Nêrens, premiered on 25 November 2015
After 9, premiered on 9 April 2016
Stille Water, premiered on 9 April 2016 at Compagnietheater, Amsterdam
Nomvula, premiered on 3 September 2016, The Hague
Rite: Ndinyindoda siyaya..., premiered on 2 October 2016, Rotterdam
Silver & Gold (You&I), premiered on 4 March 2017 at Dance Umbrella Johannesburg, Wits Theatre Complex
In Your Hands, premiered on 22 September 2017 at Artscape Theatre Centre, Cape Town
Katrina Die Dansende Taal, premiered on 19 September 2018 at Artscape Theatre Centre, Cape Town

References

1992 births
2020 deaths
People from Cape Town
University of Cape Town alumni
South African ballet dancers
HIV/AIDS activists
Deaths by stabbing in South Africa
South African LGBT rights activists
Ball culture
South African choreographers